The Anglican Diocese of On the Lake is one of twelve within the Anglican Province of Owerri, itself one of fourteen provinces within the Church of Nigeria: the current bishop is Chijioke Oti.

Notes

Church of Nigeria dioceses
Dioceses of the Province of Owerri